The Charlestown Mob   was an Irish mob group in Charlestown, which figured prominently in the history of Boston for much of the 20th century.

The gang was headed by the McLaughlin brothers (Bernie, Georgie, and Edward "Punchy" McLaughlin) and their associates brothers Stevie and Connie Hughes from Charlestown. Some of its notorious associates included Will Delaney, Harry Hannon, William Bennett, Edward Bennett, John Shackelford, Frank Murray, Leo Lowry, Ron Dermody and Joe "Rockball" O'Rourke.  They were involved in the Irish Gang Wars of the early to mid-1960s against Somerville's Winter Hill Gang led by James "Buddy" McLean. The decade-long gang war left both Bernie and Punchy dead and Georgie in prison. The Hughes brothers later suffered almost identical fates, as they were both shot to death on separate occasions.

See also
 Killeen Gang
 Mullen Gang
 Howie Winter

Gangs in Massachusetts
Irish-American culture in Boston
Irish-American organized crime groups